The Montserrat Secondary School, often referred to for short as MSS, is the only pre-16 years of age secondary school on the island of Montserrat. The school's campus is currently located in Salem. Prior to 2004 it was responsible for Montserrat's sixth-form education (post-16); currently Montserrat Community College (MCC) now offers Caribbean Advanced Proficiency Examinations (CAPE) sixth-form classes.

History
It was established by the 1938 merger of a government boys' secondary school, Montserrat Boys Grammar School, and a private girls' secondary school. Originally not all Montserrat citizens had the right to a secondary education, and the school chose which students may be admitted. A May 2011 Montserrat government report stated that the school "produced excellent results and enjoyed national esteem" in that time. Wealthier families were the main clientele of MSS.

There were 64 students in 1941. In 1955 its senior/modern school opened. In 1971 its junior school opened. The May 2011 government report stated that these new divisions "did not substantially alter the elitist nature of the school." The school has multiple locations before settling in Salem.

In 1986 secondary education became universal in Montserrat, and the report stated this, as well as the 1997 Soufrière Hills volcanic eruption, which reduced the student population, altered the school's culture. As a result of the establishment of universal secondary education, MSS established three branch junior school campuses in Dagenham, Salem, and Thompson Field.

In the pre-1997 period it was the sole school with upper secondary education, with its senior secondary division being the  Montserrat Senior Secondary School, and its junior secondary being a lower section. The campuses together had 1,043 students in 1988.

The volcanic eruption and population loss resulted in the dissolution of MSS's sixth-form college; Montserrat Community College took over sixth-form studies upon its opening in 2004. The school now has a single campus in Salem.

By 2011 the teacher population had a lack of stability, contrasting with local-origin teachers of previous generations. In addition, and multiple "behavioural problems" had occurred "for several years". In 2011 there were 300 students; some of the school's students had English as a second language as they were immigrants.

Campus
It occasionally closed during ash falls as it is in the volcano's ash shadow. A report from the UK Department for International Development (DFID) stated that the school is a long distance from the major settlements in northern Montserrat.

Principals of the Montserrat Secondary School, 1928 – present
H. G. Carrington (1928–1957)
Vincent Bennett Browne (1957–1968)
Mr Holden
Mr Hoppy
Charles T. John (1976–1979)
Peter White (1979–1990)
Oeslyn Jemmotte (1990–1993)
Lucy Fenton (1993–1995)
Camela Watts (1995–1998)
Kathleen Greenaway (1998–2004)
Glen Francis (2004–2006)
Alric Taylor (2006–2009)
Cherlyn Hogan (2009–2020)
Tony Allen (2020-present)

Notable alumni
 Arrow, a calypsonian and soca musician named Alphonsus Celestine Edmund Cassell, who is regarded as the first superstar of soca from Montserrat.
Donaldson Romeo, the second Premier of Montserrat.
Sheree Jemmotte-Rodney, the current acting Attorney General of Montserrat.

See also
 Education in Montserrat

References

Further reading
 John, C.T. "The Montserrat Secondary School Cadet Corps." 1988. In: Fergus, H. (editor). The Royal Montserrat Defence Force, 1848–1998: A Force for Good. Royal Montserrat Defence Force. p. 36-38.

External links
"MONTSERRAT SECONDARY SCHOOL REVIEW REPORT." Government of Montserrat. May 2011.

Secondary schools in British Overseas Territories
Schools in Montserrat
Sixth form colleges in British Overseas Territories
Educational institutions established in 1938
1938 establishments in the British Empire
Montserrat